RLK may refer to:

 Ottawa Valley Railway, reporting mark RLK
Bayannur Tianjitai Airport, IATA code RLK